Marek Hanousek (born 6 August 1991) is a Czech professional footballer who plays for Widzew Łódź. He has represented his country at the under-21 level.

Club career

Dukla
Hanousek played in the Czech 2. Liga with Dukla from 2009. In an August 2010 match against Viktoria Žižkov, Hanousek was shown a red card for a foul on Igor Súkenník in the penalty area after 88 minutes. The game, having been tied 1−1, was won from the subsequent penalty kick by Žižkov striker Miroslav Marković. Dukla lost just two more times that season to finish the 2010–11 Czech 2. Liga eight points clear of any other team and thus winning promotion to the Gambrinus liga.

Having been promoted to the top flight, Hanousek made his Gambrinus liga debut with Dukla on 29 July 2011 against Sigma Olomouc, going on to score five goals in fifteen starts in the first half of the 2011–12 Gambrinus liga. In February 2012 he signed for Viktoria Plzeň on a three and half year contract, however according to the terms of his contract he stayed at Dukla until the end of the season.

Plzeň
Hanousek returned to Juliska in September 2012 and scored the fourth goal for Plzeň against his former club in a 4−1 win for the visitors.

Hanousek returned to Dukla on loan in September 2013 until the end of the 2013–14 season, although he returned to Plzeň in January 2014. After spending the second half of the season on loan at Dukla, he transferred back to the club, signing a three-year contract in June 2014.

Career statistics

International career
Hanousek has played at national level for youth teams of the Czech Republic. He started with the under-18 team in 2008 and subsequently represented his country at each subsequent level up to under-21.

Honours
 Dukla Prague
Czech 2. Liga (1): 2010–11

 Viktoria Plzeň
Gambrinus Liga (1): 2012–13

References

1991 births
Living people
Czech footballers
Czech expatriate footballers
Association football midfielders
Czech Republic youth international footballers
Czech Republic under-21 international footballers
People from Benešov District
SK Slavia Prague players
MFK Karviná players
FK Dukla Prague players
FC Viktoria Plzeň players
Widzew Łódź players
Czech National Football League players
Czech First League players
I liga players
Ekstraklasa players
Expatriate footballers in Poland
Czech expatriate sportspeople in Poland
Sportspeople from the Central Bohemian Region